Diaphus ehrhorni is a species of lanternfish found in the Philippines and the Western Central Pacific Ocean.

Etymology
The fish is named in honor of entomologist Edward M. Ehrhorn (1862-1941), of Honolulu, Hawaii.

References

Myctophidae
Taxa named by Henry Weed Fowler
Fish described in 1934